In 1929 Charles Read was designated the Squash Rackets Open Champion of Great Britain.
It was decided that from 1930 both professionals and amateurs could play each other in a new event called the Squash Rackets Open Championship of Great Britain. The champion could be challenged by another player, normally either the professional or amateur champion for the right to earn the title of champion of Great Britain. The designated champion was Charles Read based on previous professional challenge results listed below.

Results

1907

1908

1920

1928

References

Men's British Open Squash Championships
Squash in England
Men's British Open Squash Championship
Men's British Open Squash Championship